Dušan Basta (born 18 August 1984) is a Serbian former professional right-sided full-back who played most recently for Italian club Lazio. He made his national team debut for Serbia in 2005. He was in the squad for his nation in one major tournament - FIFA World Cup 2006. He has made a total of 18 caps for Serbia.

Club career

Early years
The first football step Basta made was when he was eight – in local football club PKB from Padinska Skela, the suburb where he lived and where he was born. He then signed for Red Star aged thirteen, becoming a part of one of the most talented generations in the history of Red Star's youth academy.

Red Star Belgrade
Basta signed his first professional contract at the age of 17, when he together with a few teammates from Red Star's youth team broke out into the senior squad. He made his professional debut on his 18th birthday (18 August 2002) in a 1–0 defeat from Sutjeska in Nikšić, Montenegro. In the following, his second season, he played on loan in Jedinstvo Ub (along with Aleksandar Luković and Boško Janković). Over the season Basta displayed great technique, skills, and pass accuracy and very soon he became one of the most important players for Red Star Belgrade. In April 2005 Basta suffered an injury which kept him out of football for five months. By the end of his spell at Red Star, Basta won six trophies with Red Star Belgrade, including three domestic doubles.

Udinese
In July 2008 he moved from Red Star Belgrade to Udinese. He played in pre-season friendlies for Udinese. However, Udinese did not wish to allocate one of the two non-EU registration quota on Basta, and Basta moved to Lecce on loan from Red Star Belgrade, in order to borrow the quota from Lecce, like his teammate and countryman Aleksandar Luković.

After returning to Udinese in summer 2009, he became the starting right wingback soon after the season started instead of his usual midfield position. He made his debut on 23 September 2009 against A.C. Milan, replacing Mauricio Isla after 27 minutes. Udinese won the match 1–0. After injuries to Simone Pepe, he played as a right-sided midfielder in their 3–5–2 formation for a few matches. Basta was later injured and missed the whole 2010–11 Serie A season, meaning that Mauricio Isla secured Basta's place in the team.

Basta made his return after 18 months on 11 September, the first gameweek of the 2011–12 Serie A season. In that match the coach Francesco Guidolin rested Isla, using Basta as the right wingback in their 3–5–2 formation. He scored a goal, beating Lecce 2–0. In the next match, the first group stage match of the 2011–12 UEFA Europa League, Basta returned to the bench. On 6 November 2011, Basta scored the first goal in a 2–1 victory against Siena. On 11 December 2011, the Serb headed in Udinese's second goal in a 2–1 victory against Chievo. He then scored a powerful shot against struggling Cesena.

Lazio
Basta signed with Lazio on 23 June 2014 in a temporary deal, with an obligation to buy. Eventually Basta cost Lazio €10.5 million.

On 30 April 2017 Basta returned to score a goal in the Serie A, three years later the previous one (Udinese-Roma 2–3, 17 March 2014) and against the same opponent team: his goal allowed Lazio to win the Derby della Capitale against the city rivals of Roma (Lazio won the match 3–1 away and Basta scored the second goal).

International career
Basta debuted for his country against Spain on 31 March 2005. He substituted Ognjen Koroman in 77 minutes. He collected his second cap in Tunisia. He was in Serbia and Montenegro team for World Cup in Germany, but he did not play.

For Serbia U21s selection he played 18 games and he played on two European Under-21 Football Championship, First time in Portugal 2006 he reached semi-final, second time he became losing finalists in the Netherlands 2007. He was called up by the caretaker of the Serbia national football team, Radovan Ćurčić, for two friendly matches, against Mexico and Honduras, as a replacement for the injured Neven Subotić. Shortly after being called up, he suffered an injury. Ćurčić called up Nemanja Tomić, Adem Ljajić and Andrija Kaluđerović instead.

In June 2018, Basta was left out from Serbia's 23-man squad for the 2018 FIFA World Cup in Russia.

Career statistics

Club

International

International goals

Honours
Red Star Belgrade
Serbian SuperLiga: 2005–06, 2006–07
Serbian Cup: 2005–06, 2006–07
Lazio
Supercoppa Italiana: 2017
Coppa Italia: 2018–2019

References

External links

1984 births
Living people
Serbian footballers
Footballers from Belgrade
Association football defenders
Serbia international footballers
Serbia under-21 international footballers
Serbia and Montenegro international footballers
Serbia and Montenegro under-21 international footballers
2006 FIFA World Cup players
Red Star Belgrade footballers
FK Jedinstvo Ub players
First League of Serbia and Montenegro players
Serbian SuperLiga players
Udinese Calcio players
U.S. Lecce players
S.S. Lazio players
Serie A players
Serbian expatriate footballers
Serbian expatriate sportspeople in Italy
Expatriate footballers in Italy
Serbia and Montenegro footballers